66° Pohjoista Leveyttä is the 13th album by Mandopop singer Valen Hsu. It was released on 28 December 2007.

Track listing
Disc one
 看完煙火再回去 (Let's go back after watching the fireworks)
 男人女人 (Men and Woman)
 手寫愛 (Handwritten love)
 我絕對不說我愛你 (I would never say I love you)
 愛人動物 (Animal lover)
 樂天市場 (Lotte market)
 飛行時光 (Flight time)
 愛情．進站 (Love.stop)
 見過永遠 (Ever seen)
 北緯六十六度 (66° Pohjoista Leveyttä)

Bonus music video disc
 北緯六十六度 (66° Pohjoista Leveyttä)
 看完煙火再回去 (Let's go back after watching the fireworks)
 手寫愛 (Handwritten love)
 我絕對不說我愛你 (I would never say I love you)
 男人女人 (Men and Woman)

References

External links
Valen Hsu Official Site

2007 albums
Valen Hsu albums